Dharala Prabhu is a 2020 Indian Tamil-language romantic comedy film written and directed by Krishna Marimuthu in his directorial debut. A remake of the 2012 Hindi film Vicky Donor, the film stars Harish Kalyan, Tanya Hope and Vivek. The film's concept is set against the backdrop of sperm donation and infertility, with Prabhu (Harish Kalyan) approached by Dr. Kannadasan (Vivek), the owner of a fertility clinic, to become a sperm donor for which he eventually agrees.

The film was initially reported for a Tamil remake in early 2012, with a project starring Siddharth in the lead role eventually fails to materialise despite its announcements. Eight years later in May 2019, Screen Scene Media Entertainment acquired the remake rights with Harish Kalyan being hired for the film and the project started the following month. The cinematography was handled by Selvakumar S. K. and edited by Kripakaran, the film features a soundtrack album composed by Anirudh Ravichander, Sean Roldan, Vivek-Mervin, Inno Genga, Madley Blues, Bharath Shankar, Kaber Vasuki and Oorka.

Dharala Prabhu was released theatrically on 13 March 2020. With theatres being shut down due to the COVID-19 pandemic, affecting its collections, the film was made available in digital platform Amazon Prime Video, less than a month after its release. Nevertheless, the film opened to positive reviews from critics and became a breakthrough film for Harish Kalyan and ended up as a decent hit by its other revenue. The film also marked Vivek's final release before his death.

Plot 
Dr. Kannadasan MBBS is a fertility doctor who runs and manages a fertility clinic in Chennai with the help of his assistant, Kaamu. He promises high-quality sperm for his patients but is frustrated at his lack of success due to his inability to find a healthy sperm donor. Through his contact at the Employment Exchange Department, he reviews the employment applications filed under the sports category, finding a suitable person in the name of Prabhu Govind.

Prabhu, a happy-go-lucky young man with an outstanding flair for playing football, aspires to gain his dream job under the sports quota in order to support his mother Vaanathi and his grandmother, both of whom run a beauty spa. One day, while making a delivery at a mall on the behest of his mother, Prabhu meets Nidhi Mandhana, an employee and divorcee, and is instantly smitten by her. He later notices Kannadasan following him and corners him. Kannadasan, in a friendly manner, requests Prabhu to make a sperm donation, to which the latter rejects outright, out of disgust. Undeterred, Kannadasan follows Prabhu everywhere, determined to gain his sperm. Meanwhile, Prabhu regularly visits Nidhi at the mall and the two grow close.

Later, after witnessing his football coach lamenting about his inability to have a child with his late wife, Prabhu has a change of heart and approaches Kannadasan. He regularly makes donations to Kannadasan, who in turn pays him for every donation he makes. Prabhu lavishly spends the money and lives happily. He maintains his donations a secret from his family. However, upon discovering that Kannadasan had repeatedly sabotaged his numerous attempts at gaining employment in order to remain in business, Prabhu leaves him and decides to marry Nidhi. Guilty, Kannadasan makes up for Prabhu by securing him his dream job and settling the rift between his family and Nidhi's, resulting in them getting happily married. Prabhu, now reconciled with Kannadasan, makes one final donation to him (albeit at his nudging). Kannadasan uses Prabu's sperm to covertly provide a Kid for a State minister, and gets a huge amount as settlement.

Nidhi yearns to have a child with Prabhu but is unable to have one. Three years pass, but the couple is unable to bear a child. Kannadasan later explains that Nidhi is infertile, leaving Prabhu devastated. Despite Kannadasan's request to conceive a child through surrogacy, Prabhu and Nidhi decide to adopt a child. They adopt Kavya, a three-year-old girl, whose parents had died in a car accident. Later, at home, Prabhu discovers that Kavya is actually his biological child, conceived through one of his donations, leaving him horrified. He confronts Kannadasan, who admits the truth. He urges Prabhu to raise Kavya with love and care. Despite this shock, Prabhu softens up to Kavya and raises her as his own child, also maintaining her true origins as a secret from his family. Prabhu's family grows close to Kavya, but are unaware of her true origins.

Later, the Income Tax Department arrests Prabhu on the charges of handling black money, and Kannadasan comes to his aid. With no other record, Kannadasan is forced to reveal the truth to the police, and they both escape prosecution using the influence of the Minister. Disgusted with the truth, Nidhi leaves Prabhu. Prabhu reconciles with Kannadasan and begs to Nidhi for forgiveness. Kannadasan later invites Prabhu, Nidhi, and Kavya to a function held at an orphanage. He explains to Nidhi that although Prabhu keeping his actions a secret from her was wrong, he urges her to look at the good intentions behind them and reveals to her the happiness that Prabhu gave to numerous families through his donations. He further reveals that 49 children were conceived through Prabhu's donations. With a change of heart, Nidhi reconciles with Prabhu. Prabhu, Nidhi, Kavya, Kannadasan, and other families (whose children were conceived via Prabhu) celebrate.

Cast 

 Harish Kalyan as Prabhu Govind
 Vivek as Dr. Kannadasan 
 Tanya Hope as Nidhi Mandanna
 Baby Nikhitha as Kavya
 Anupama Kumar as Vaanathi, Prabhu's mother
 Sachu as Kundhavai, Prabhu's grandmother
 R. S. Shivaji as Kaamu, Kannadasan's assistant
 Akalya Venkatesan as Latha
 Haresh Vikram as himself
 Ravindra Vijay as Coach Manoj Kumar
 Siddharth Venkataraman as Kavya's father
 Nanditha Sreekumar as Kavya's mother 
 Subha as Manoj Kumar's wife
 Namo Narayana as Minister Kaathavarayan
  Ravi Bhatt as Prasad, Nidhi's father
 Madhuvanti Arun as Prema, Nidhi's aunt
 Meera Krishnamurthi as Amudha
 RJ Ananthi as Kalpana
 Lallu as Satish
 Cell Murugan as Vanangamudi
 Gayathri as Chandra
 Latha as a Fertility doctor
 Raja Thirumugan as Paneerselvam
 Nanditha as Kavya's mother
 Siddharth as Kavya's father

Production 
After the overwhelming success of Vicky Donor, a Tamil remake of the film was reported to be produced by Siddharth who acquired the remake rights of the film under his banner Etaki Entertainment. Later YNOT Studios also interested in the film's production, collaborating with the actor for the second time after Kadhalil Sodhappuvadhu Yeppadi, and was reported to be made as a bilingual in Tamil and Telugu. But no developments had been made further despite its initial announcement. The same year, another Telugu film titled Eenade Edho Ayyindi, starring Brahmanandam's son Raja Gautham in the lead role was reported to be the remake film, but the claims were refuted by its director Madhura Sreedhar. The film which was later made in Telugu as Naruda Donoruda was released in November 2016.

In May 2019, Screen Scene Media Entertainment which acquired the remake rights of the film announced that Harish Kalyan will play the lead role reprising Ayushmann Khurrana's character in the original version. At the end of the month, it was reported that Krishna Marimuthu who helmed the 2017 Telugu film Yuddham Sharanam was brought on board as the director, and the film's tentative title Dharala Prabhu was also announced. In June 2019, Tanya Hope and Vivek were brought on to the film's cast essaying pivotal roles. Principal shooting of the film began the same month with filming took place across the suburbs of Chennai. The first look of the film was released in January 2020, with the film's tentative title Dharala Prabhu was finalised as the official title.

Soundtrack

The soundtrack album of Dharala Prabhu, features eight songs composed by eight different composers, which includes Anirudh Ravichander, Sean Roldan, Vivek-Mervin, Inno Genga, Madley Blues, Bharath Shankar, Kaber Vasuki and Oorka. The background score is composed by Bharath Shankar. Lyrics for the songs were written by Vignesh Shivan, Subu, Nixy, Bharath Shankar and Kaber Vasuki. The audio rights were acquired by Sony Music India. Before the album released, five out of eight songs were been released as singles.

The first single "Aaha Ooho" composed by the Oorka band, was released on 5 February 2020. The second single "Unnaal Penne" composed and sung by Inno Genga, with lyrics written by Vignesh Shivan, was released on 17 February 2020. The third single track "Rasa Mavan" sung by stand-up comedian Alexander Babu and Harish Venkat, with the former making his singing debut, was released on 28 February 2020. The fourth single "Kaadhal Theevey", composed by Sean Roldan and sung by Sid Sriram, was released on 1 March 2020. The fifth single "Dharala Prabhu Title Track" sung and composed by Anirudh, was released on 4 March 2020. The title track was re-used from Nani's Gang Leader (2019). The remaining songs were released on 6 March 2020. Post release a bonus track "Maatra Thendral" was released on 3 June 2020.

Marketing and release 
The film's official teaser was released on 29 January 2020, and the trailer was released on 21 February. Dharala Prabhu was theatrically released on 13 March 2020. The film was made available through the digital platform Amazon Prime Video in April 2020. The film was later re-released in theatres, post Tamil Nadu government granted permission for its reopening with 50% occupancy on 10 November 2020.

Reception

Critical reception 
Thinkal Menon of The Times of India gave 3 stars out of 5 and wrote, "A better background score and more effort on the emotional scenes would have made the movie a perfect remake." Pradeep Kumar of The Hindu wrote "Harish Kalyan’s film takes aim, but misses its objective of sensitising the Tamil audience to the concept of sperm donation, by quite some distance." S. Subhakeerthana of The Indian Express gave 3 out of 5 and stated "Though Dharala Prabhu ends on a sentimental note, it is fairly entertaining." Sreedhar Pillai, for Firstpost, gave 3 out of 5 stating "Dharala Prabhu is an engaging, breezy entertainer which has the perfect blend of comedy and emotions, along with solid performances from its lead actors." Janani K of India Today gave 2.5 out of 5 and wrote "Dharala Prabhu is a remake with Tamil sentiments. It’s good that the film does not dilute the concept of sperm donation." Karthik Kumar of Hindustan Times wrote "Dharala Prabhu is not one of those remakes that blindly recreate the original scene by scene. It’s evident from the little but crucial changes made to suit Tamil sensibilities that effort has gone into the project to make it appealing."

Sify gave 3.5 out of 5 and wrote: "The film takes a light-hearted, optimistic look at infertility and artificial insemination that entertains and enlightens the audiences". Behindwoods gave the film 3 out of 5 and stated "The film takes up a noble subject at its core and despite being a remake that comes after eight years, the fresh treatment and good performances keep us invested in the movie. On the whole, Dharala Prabhu is a faithful remake that tickles you throughout, while still touching your sensitive nerves." Indiaglitz gave the film a rating of 3.25 out of 5 stating "Go for this breezy entertainer that mixes strong humane messages coated with fun." Baradwaj Rangan of Film Companion wrote, "Very deceptively, very casually, Dharala Prabhu addresses a number of issues without making them feel like “issues” (i.e. there are no lectures).... even the central issue is treated with lightness."

Box office 
Dharala Prabhu had a strong opening weekend collecting ₹35.03 lakhs from 123 shows in Chennai box office. However the film had a receding occupancy due to the fear of coronavirus pandemic, as well as theatres being shut down from 16 March 2020 (three days after the film's release) as a precautionary measure in order to control the pandemic situation. The film collected ₹3.2 crores from its theatrical premiere across India and ₹3.4 crores worldwide. The film was made available for viewing on OTT platforms less than a month after its theatrical release due to the COVID-19 lockdown in India.

References

External links 

 

Indian romantic comedy films
2020 romantic comedy films
2020s Tamil-language films
2020 films
Films about sperm donation
Tamil remakes of Hindi films
Films scored by Anirudh Ravichander
Films scored by Sean Roldan